Pamela Vezey (19 September 1932, Bath, Somerset - 18 June 1992) was an English actress best known for her roles as Kath Brownlow/Fellowes in Crossroads and as the mother of Carol and Trisha Yates in the children's television series Grange Hill.

She died of cancer in 1992.

Television credits

References

External links
 https://www.imdb.com/name/nm0895537/?ref_=rvi_nm

English actresses
1932 births
1992 deaths
People from Bath, Somerset
English television actresses